The Egyptian civilization used a number of different crowns throughout its existence. Some were used to show authority, while others were used for religious ceremonies. Each crown was worn by different pharaohs or deities, and each crown had its own significance and symbolic meaning. The crowns include the Atef, the Deshret, the Hedjet, the Khepresh, the Pschent, and the Hemhem.

List of crowns of Egypt

Atef 
Atef, the crown of Osiris, is a combination of Upper Egypt's white crown, the hedjet, and ostrich feathers on either side.  It also often has a golden disc at its tip.  The ostrich feathers, similar to those representing ma’at, symbolize truth, justice, morality, and balance.  They represent the cult center of Orisis as well, which is located in Abydos.  The atef is typically worn atop a pair of ram or bull horns as a circlet.

The atef crown is seen as far back as the 5th dynasty. According to Egyptian beliefs, this crown represents Osiris as the god of fertility, ruler of the afterlife, and a representative of the cycle of death and rebirth.  Later on, though, it came to be worn by other pharaohs because of the belief that they would become a form of Osiris after their death. In their tombs, the pharaohs would have themselves depicted as Osiris by wearing his crown.  During Middle Kingdom Egypt, even regular citizens could have Osiris's crown because Osiris had become the judge of the deceased. It was also worn during religious rituals.

Deshret 
The crown of Lower Egypt, also known as deshret, is a red bowl shaped crown with a protruding curlicue. It is typically associated with the rulers and pharaohs of Lower Egypt. The word deshret is also the name for the arid land surrounding the Nile River area.

The red color of the crown is symbolic of the “red land”, arid desert land that surrounded the fertile “black land” of Kemet. The curlicue of the crown is symbolic of the proboscis, or stinger, of the honey bee. The crown was woven, like a basket, of plant fiber, perhaps grass, straw, flax, palm leaf, or reed. It is theorized that it was passed down from king to king instead of being buried with each king, which might explain why no actual deshret has been found.

Representations of the deshret can be seen as early as the late Naqada I period, around 3500 BCE. In these early predynastic times, it is believed the crown was worn in association with the god Seth, and it was not until the formation of the first dynasties, around 3000 BCE, that it became symbolic of rule over Lower Egypt.

In Egyptian mythology, it is believed that deshret was first given to the god Horus by Geb to symbolize his rule over Lower Egypt. The crown was then passed on to pharaohs, who saw themselves as successors to Horus. The goddess Neith, when depicted in a human body, is usually shown wearing the crown of Lower Egypt. The earliest depiction of Neith in this crown was first found in the temple of Userkaf in Abu Gorab, which was constructed in 2499 BCE.

Hedjet 
The hedjet, also known as hdt, is the crown worn by the king of Upper (Southern) Egypt.  It resembles a bowling pin and is also called the “White One.”  In addition, this crown is one half of the double crown, the pschent.  No crowns are known to have been found in any archeological digs.  Some Egyptologists have speculated that the hedjet was made out of leather, felt, or some other fabric. Another possibility is that it was woven like a basket, as the deshret (red crown) is known to have been, of plant fiber. A hedjet with Nekhbet the vulture goddess next to the head of the cobra goddess is the symbol used to represent the hedjet.  Several Egyptian gods, such a Nekhbet and Horus, are seen in some drawings and carvings wearing the hedjet.  Images of this crown have been found in Ta-Seti (Northern Nubia in 3500–3200 BCE), a tomb in Deir-el-Bahari, the Narmer Palette, and on a statue of Pharaoh Sesostris I.

Hemhem 
The hemhem crown was an ornate triple atef with corkscrew sheep horns and usually two uraei. The Egyptian word "hemhem" means "to shout," "cry out," possibly indicating that the hemhem crown represented a battle horn.

Pschent 
The double crown represented the unification of the two regions of Egypt, Upper and Lower Egypt. It is also referred to as the sekhemty, which means "The Two Powerful Ones", or as the pschent. The pschent combines the hedjet (white crown of Upper Egypt) with the deshret (red Crown of Lower Egypt).  An interesting inscription found in the tomb of a Fourth Dynasty pharaoh states, “He has eaten the red crown… and delights to have [the crown’s] magic in his belly.”  Historians believe this is a metaphorical reference to Upper Egypt conquering Lower Egypt as described on the Narmer Palette.  Menes is credited with the invention of the double crown, although the first pharaoh to wear the Crown was Djet. Horus is depicted wearing the double crown as well as Atum, both of which have a distinct relationship with the pharaoh.As with the deshret and hedjet, no pschent has been found; everything known about them comes from ancient tales, inscriptions, and depictions.

Cap crown 
Attested as early as the Old Kingdom, the cap crown is most commonly associated with the Dynasty 25 Kushite kings, who are frequently depicted wearing the crown with two uraei. In that era, the crown was referred to as a sdn. The remnants of what appears to be a cap crown (JE 62699) were found on the mummy of Tutankhamun. Tutankhamun's crown consisted of a band of gold wrapped around the king's temples that secured a linen skullcap, which had mostly decayed by the time of the tomb's excavation. The gold band was itself kept in place by a ribbon tied into a bow at the back of the head. Still remaining and mounted on the skullcap are four uraei made of gold beads and red and blue glass beads. In the center of each uraeus is a gold cartouche containing the name of the Aten. The skullcap portion of the crown resembles, and was likely associated with, the skullcap worn by the deity Ptah.

See also
 Crown of justification
 Radiant crown
 Vulture crown
 Modius (headdress)
 Nemes

References

External links

Crowns by country
Egyptian artefact types